The Kerala State Film Award for Best Singer is an honour, established in 1969, and presented annually at the Kerala State Film Awards of India for best female and male playback singer in Malayalam cinema. The first recipients of the award were P. Leela and K. J. Yesudas. K. J. Yesudas has been the winner with 25 wins, followed by K. S. Chithra with 16 and S. Janaki with 11 awards.K. S. Chithra won the award for 11 successive years ( 1985 - 1996 ) that is the most times ever

Best Male Playback Singer
Most Awards

Frequent Winner

Best Female Playback Singer

Frequent Winner

Special Jury Award and Special Jury Mention In This Category

Best Classical Music Singer

References
Official website
PRD, Govt. of Kerala: Awardees List
Kerala State Film Award 2014 
 Specific

Kerala State Film Awards